Karl Wolf (27 May 1924 – 26 November 2005) was a German footballer. He played in ten matches for the East Germany national football team from 1954 to 1957.

References

1924 births
2005 deaths
East German footballers
East Germany international footballers
Place of birth missing
Association footballers not categorized by position